The list of Wii games spans from the console's launch in 2006 to the last game release in 2020. There are  video games for the Wii video game console.

Games 
On November 19, 2006, the Wii launch was accompanied by 22 launch games. The last game releases for the Wii, Retro City Rampage DX+ and Shakedown: Hawaii, were released on July 9, 2020.
Nintendo issued re-releases for key retail Wii games with the Nintendo Selects label, but those do not count as new releases. The original Wii revision is backward compatible with games made for its predecessor, the GameCube. This list does not include games released on Virtual Console or WiiWare.

This list is sorted by game title, developer, publisher, release date, and region by Japanese, European, Australian, and American. A game title without a region abbreviation in superior letters is a North American title and may be shared in another region if there is no secondary title with a matching region in superior letters.

The "Japan" column involves NTSC-J software, which is compatible with Hong Kong, Taiwan and other selected Asian consoles, besides South Korea. This kind of software would not be compatible with South Korean Wii consoles. "Europe" and "Australia/Asia" are both under PAL/SECAM. "North America" is under NTSC territories, including Central and South Americas, and sometimes, in the case of various Nintendo-published titles, in Southeast Asia and the Middle East.

For a chronological list, click the sort button in any of the available regions' columns.

There are  games on this list.

Bundled Games
The following games consist of two or more individually released games that were re-released onto a single disc afterwards.

Applications

Notes

References

External links
 Nintendo Europe release list
 Nintendo Japan release list
 Wii  at IGN

Wii
Wii games
Wii